Jürgen Rohwer (24 May 192424 July 2015) was a German military historian and professor of history at the University of Stuttgart. Rohwer wrote over 400 books and essays on World War II naval history and military intelligence, which gained him worldwide recognition as a prominent historian and a leading authority on U-boats.

Biography 
Rohwer was born in Friedrichroda. After leaving school in 1942, he entered the Kriegsmarine as an officer candidate (crew VI/42). During World War II he served on several German warships, e.g. destroyer Z24, Sperrbrecher 104/Martha, and minesweeper M-502. After the end of the war he left service and studied history at the University of Hamburg. During that time he got into contact with Günter Hessler  son in law to Karl Dönitz  and was commissioned by the British Royal Navy to write an official account of the U-boat war 1939–1945.

In 1954 he received his doctoral degree at Hamburg University for his dissertation on German-American relations from 1937 to 1941. In 1959 he became the director of the Bibliothek für Zeitgeschichte in Stuttgart. During his tenure, the library became an internationally renown institution for military history and especially the war at sea. In the 1970s, Rohwer researched the history of cryptanalysis in World War II and especially the decoding of Enigma by the British and Polish scientists. In a cooperation of the Bibliothek für Zeitgeschichte and the University of Stuttgart, the congress "Der Mord an den europäischen Juden" (The murder of the European Jews) took place in May 1984. Together with Eberhard Jäckel, Rohwer edited the book "Der Mord an den Juden im Zweiten Weltkrieg. Entschlußbildung und Verwirklichung", which contains the most important contributions from the congress. Jürgen Rohwer retired in 1989. He died in Weinstadt.

Publications

References

External links 
 http://www.wlb-stuttgart.de/seekrieg/rohwer.htm
 https://www.stadtlexikon-stuttgart.de/dts/index.html?id=3de0c76b-3613-43db-905e-f1a5ce3142c9

Kriegsmarine personnel of World War II
20th-century German historians
1924 births
2015 deaths
People from Friedrichroda
University of Hamburg alumni
Academic staff of the University of Stuttgart
German male non-fiction writers